The 1982–83 Midland Football Combination season was the 46th in the history of Midland Football Combination, a football competition in England.

Division One

Division One featured 19 clubs which competed in the division last season along with one new club:
Walsall Borough, created by merger of Walsall Sportsco and Walsall Wood

League table

References

1982–83
8